Weston Cheyne Roberts (born March 27, 1988 in Plant City, Florida) is a retired American soccer player.

Career

Youth and college
Roberts attended Plant City High School, and played college soccer at Palm Beach Atlantic University. He was named to the ICAA First-Team, was honored as a NCCAA All-American Honorable Mention, and was awarded the Most Outstanding Offensive Player from the NCCAA National Tournament as a freshman in 2006, was named to the ICAA First Team and the NCCAA All-American First-Team while being awarded the Most Outstanding Defensive Player from the NCCAA National Tournament as a sophomore in 2007, and was an NCAA/NSCAA South Region 2nd-Team, NCCAA All-American 1st-Team, NCCAA All-Region selection, the NCCAA South Region Player of the Year and a NCCAA Scholar-Athlete as a junior in 2008.

Professional
Roberts turned professional in 2010 when he signed with the Charlotte Eagles of the USL Second Division. He made his professional debut on April 24, 2010 in a league match against the Richmond Kickers. He scored his first professional goal in his eighth league appearance for Charlotte, a 2–1 win over the Los Angeles Blues on May 14, 2011.

Coaching
Roberts was the head coach of the Ocala Stampede of the USL PDL from 2013 to 2015. In his three years at Ocala, the Stampede finished at the top of their division every season and won the PDL Southern Conference in 2014 and 2015. In 2014 and 2015, Ocala made it to the PDL's national semifinals.

On March 25, 2016, Roberts was announced as the first head coach of Tampa Bay Rowdies 2 of the National Premier Soccer League. Rowdies 2 is the official developmental team of the North American Soccer League's Tampa Bay Rowdies.

Following the transition of the Tampa Bay Rowdies 2 to the Tampa Bay Rowdies U23, Roberts moved full-time as an assistant coach for the USL club.

Cheyne's brother, Clay, is the current head coach for the MASL's Florida Tropics SC and the Southeastern Fire.

References

External links
 Charlotte Eagles bio
 PBA bio

1988 births
Living people
American soccer players
Charlotte Eagles players
VSI Tampa Bay FC players
Soccer players from Florida
USL Second Division players
USL Championship players
Tampa Bay Rowdies coaches
National Premier Soccer League coaches
USL League Two coaches
USL Championship coaches
People from Plant City, Florida
Sportspeople from Hillsborough County, Florida
Palm Beach Atlantic Sailfish men's soccer players
Association football defenders
American soccer coaches
Association football player-managers
Tampa Bay Rowdies 2 players
National Premier Soccer League players